Nigeria Aviation Handling Company (NAHCO) is a Nigerian air transportation support service company that offers ground handling service, cargo handling, power distribution, and fueling for Nigeria's air transport industry.

History 
NAHCO was established in 1979. It was privatized in 2005 and listed on the Nigerian Stock Exchange in 2006.

Controversies 

 On January 4, 2023, NAHCO staff crashed into an aircraft belonging to Air Peace at the Murtala Muhammed Airport, Lagos. It was reported that the incident was the third time in a month NAHCO equipment had damaged Air Peace aircraft. The officers responsible for the damages were suspended 3 weeks later.
 On January 23, 2023, NAHCO staff staged a 14 hour strike over poor salaries at the Murtala Muhammed Airport, Lagos causing a halt in the operations and flight cancellations of domestic and international airlines they serviced.

References 

Aircraft ground handling companies
Aviation in Nigeria
Companies listed on the Nigerian Stock Exchange
Service companies of Nigeria